Hess Old Style is an old style serif font, designed by Sol Hess for Lanston Monotype based on designs of Nicolas Jenson from 1479.  It was released in 1920 with a companion italic made available in 1923.  It was intended by Monotype to compete with ATF's popular Cloister Old Style, but it is both neater and heavier, making it more suitable for hard-finish papers. Like most Jenson-inspired designs, it has a tilted cross-stroke on the 'e'.

Copies
As far as is known, this face was not copied by other foundries, nor was it emulated by any producer of cold type. A digital copy, including bold and extra-bold weights by Steve Jackaman, is part of the International TypeFounders "Red Rooster Collection".

References

Old style serif typefaces
Letterpress typefaces
Digital typefaces
Typefaces designed by Sol Hess